The 2014 Audi Melbourne Pro Tennis Classic was a professional tennis tournament played on outdoor clay courts. It was the ninth edition of the tournament and part of the 2014 ITF Women's Circuit, offering a total of $50,000 in prize money. It took place in Indian Harbour Beach, Florida, United States, on April 28–May 4, 2014.

Singles main draw entrants

Seeds 

 1 Rankings as of April 21, 2014

Other entrants 
The following players received wildcards into the singles main draw:
  Josie Kuhlman
  Sanaz Marand
  Asia Muhammad
  Allie Will

The following players received entry from the qualifying draw:
  Samantha Crawford
  Ulrikke Eikeri
  Dia Evtimova
  Elise Mertens

The following player received entry by a lucky loser spot:
  Ellie Halbauer

The following player received entry by a special exempt:
  Taylor Townsend

Champions

Singles 

  Taylor Townsend def.  Yulia Putintseva 6–1, 6–1

Doubles 

  Asia Muhammad /  Taylor Townsend def.  Jan Abaza /  Sanaz Marand 6–2, 6–1

External links 
 2014 Audi Melbourne Pro Tennis Classic at ITFtennis.com
 Official website

2014 ITF Women's Circuit
2014
2014
2014 in American tennis
April 2014 sports events in the United States
May 2014 sports events in the United States